Daniel Seddiqui is the most traveled person in American history and is recognized as a job-hunting expert and cultural analyst. Daniel formed Living the Map, which raises awareness of the varying cultures, careers, and environments across the country through outreach, educational endeavors, and community building. Living the Map encourages people to explore the world around them, to understand and respect one another and to make continuous discoveries to better themselves. Two of his books, 50 Jobs in 50 States and Going the Extra Mile, have become bestsellers.

Many international and national media outlets featured his story, including CNN, Fox News, ABC World News Tonight, National Public Radio, The Today Show, C-SPAN, MSNBC, Newsweek, Los Angeles Times, Psychology Today,New York Post, New York Daily News, Associated Press, Yahoo! News, The Weather Channel, Reuters, The Huffington Post, Chicago Tribune, Chicago Sun-Times, Golf Digest, Time, Inc., The Travel Magazine, Blaze TV, The CW, FOX Sports, Forbes, Oakland Tribune, Runner's World, and the San Francisco Chronicle.

Adventures
A Piece of Your City a journey through every major U.S. city to craft a meaningful piece reflecting the culture, history, and industry of each destination.  Daniel sprayed graffiti art in New York City, molded a clay piggy bank in Charlotte, weaved sweetgrass baskets in Charleston, pressed vinyl records in Cleveland, and poured latte art in Seattle.

American Bucket List Challenge inspired by the tension and division in America's current climate, Daniel embarked on a 50 states in 50 days mission to explore cultures.  He participated in a unique activity/event in each state to better understand and respect peoples' livelihoods. Of the many experiences, Daniel sang with the Mormon Tabernacle Choir in Utah, played the blues in Mississippi, tailgated at an Alabama football game, sailed in Rhode Island, and competed in a cornstalk archery contest with Cherokee Indians in Oklahoma.

Drop Me In! is an education endeavor which leads Daniel into the secluded and struggling regions of America to confront the everyday challenges that many Americans face.  Regions he covers are to be announced on his website.

50 Jobs in 50 States Daniel has worked 50 different jobs in 50 states in 50 weeks, followed by a book, titled 50 Jobs in 50 States: One Man's Journey of Discovery across America.  It was published by Berrett-Koehler Publishers and was released in March 2011.  Of the many jobs, Daniel has been a lobsterman in Maine, a cheesemaker in Wisconsin, a park ranger in Wyoming, high school football coach in Alabama, and a rodeo announcer in South Dakota.

Education
Daniel graduated from the University of Southern California in 2005 with a degree in economics.  He was also a track star at both the University of Oregon and USC.

Professional life
Unable to find a job in his chosen field after college, Daniel envisaged the plan of working a different job in a different state each week. Not long thereafter, Daniel fulfilled his plan, each week working a job that manifested the culture and economy of the state through which he passed.  Daniel completed his last job in September 2009 and now has released a book to share his experiences. He is also working on a lecture circuit and semester program for college students to help find their interests and experience the cultures and lifestyles of America.

Personal life
Daniel grew up in Los Altos, California.

Sources

External links
 

Living people
People from Los Altos, California
Economists from California
University of Southern California alumni
University of Oregon alumni
21st-century American economists
Year of birth missing (living people)